Younis Bese (born 7 July 1996) is a Fijian rugby union player and former sprinter.

Biography 
Bese won a gold medal in the 200m at the 2014 Oceania Athletics Championships in the Cook Islands. She was then runner-up to Papua New Guinea's Toea Wisil in the 100m.

Bese competed at the 2014 Commonwealth Games in Glasgow, Scotland. She represented Fiji in the women's 100m and 200m events. She finished in 7th place in the 100m heats and in 6th place in the 200m heats.

Bese then won two silver medals for Fiji at the 2015 Pacific Games in the 100m and 200m events.

Rugby Union career 
In 2022, Bese was one of two replacement players that was called into the Fijiana Drua squad for round five of the Super W competition. She made her Super W debut off the bench against the Waratahs. She then made the starting line up against the Brumbies in the final round.

Bese was named in the Fijiana squad for two test matches against Australia and Japan in May. She made her international debut for Fiji against Japan and scored a try.

References

External links 

 Younis Bese at World Athletics

1996 births
Living people
Female rugby union players
Fijian female rugby union players
Fiji women's international rugby union players
Fijian female sprinters
Athletes (track and field) at the 2014 Commonwealth Games
Commonwealth Games competitors for Fiji